Natica gruveli is a species of predatory sea snail, a marine gastropod mollusk in the family Naticidae, the moon snails.

Description
The length of the shell attains 21 mm.

Distribution
This marine species occurs off Gabon.

References

 Bernard, P. A. (1983). Three new Naticids from the Gabonense Coasts (Gasteropoda: Naticidae). La Conchiglia. 15(172-173): 20-21
 Gofas, S.; Afonso, J.P.; Brandào, M. (Ed.). (S.a.). Conchas e Moluscos de Angola = Coquillages et Mollusques d'Angola. [Shells and molluscs of Angola]. Universidade Agostinho / Elf Aquitaine Angola: Angola. 140 pp

External links
 Dautzenberg P. (1910). Contribution à la faune malacologique de l'Afrique occidentale. Actes de la Société Linnéenne de Bordeaux. 64: 47-228, pls 1-4 

Naticidae
Gastropods described in 1910